William Marshal, 1st Earl of Pembroke (1146 or 1147 – 14 May 1219), also called William the Marshal (Norman French: ,), was an Anglo-Norman soldier and statesman. He served five English kings—Henry II, his sons the "Young King" Henry, Richard I, and John, and finally John's son Henry III.

Knighted in 1166, he spent his younger years as a knight errant and a successful tournament competitor; Stephen Langton eulogised him as the "best knight that ever lived." In 1189, he became the de facto earl of Pembroke through his marriage to Isabel de Clare, though the title of earl was not officially granted until 1199 during the second creation of the Pembroke earldom. In 1216, he was appointed protector for the nine-year-old Henry III, and regent of the kingdom.

Before him, his father's family held a hereditary title of Marshal to the king, which by his father's time had become recognised as a chief or master Marshalcy, involving management over other Marshals and functionaries. William became known as "the Marshal", although by his time much of the function was delegated to more specialised representatives (as happened with other functions in the King's household). Because he was an earl, and also known as the marshal, the term "earl marshal" was commonly used and this later became an established hereditary title in the English peerage.

Early life
William's father, John Marshal, supported King Stephen when he took the throne in 1135, but in about 1139 he changed sides to support the Empress Matilda in the civil war of succession between her and Stephen which led to the collapse of England into "the Anarchy".

When King Stephen besieged Newbury Castle in 1152, according to William's biographer, he used the young William as a hostage to ensure that John kept his promise to surrender the castle. John, however, used the time allotted to reinforce the castle and to alert Matilda's forces. When Stephen ordered John to surrender immediately, threatening that William would be hanged, John replied that he should go ahead saying, "I still have the hammer and the anvil with which to forge still more and better sons!" Subsequently, a pretence was made to launch William from a pierrière (a type of trebuchet) towards the castle. Stephen could not bring himself to harm young William. William remained a crown hostage for many months, and was released following the peace resulting from the terms agreed at Winchester on 6 November 1153, by which the civil war was ended.

Knight-Errant

As a younger son of a minor nobleman, William had no lands or fortune to inherit, and had to make his own way in life. Around the age of twelve, when his father's career was faltering, he was sent to the Château de Tancarville in Normandy to be brought up in the household of William de Tancarville, a great magnate and cousin of young William's mother. Here he began his training as a knight. This would have included biblical stories, Latin prayers, and exposure to French romance literature to confer precepts of chivalry upon the future knight. In Tancarville's household he is also likely to have learned practical lessons in the politics of courtly life. According to his thirteenth-century biography, Marshal had enemies at Tancarville's court who plotted against him—presumably men threatened by his close relationship with the magnate.

In 1166, he was knighted on campaign in Upper Normandy, then being invaded from Flanders. His first experience in battle received mixed reviews. However, as medieval historian David Crouch remarks, "War in the twelfth century was not fought wholly for honour. Profit was there to be made..." In this regard Marshal was not so successful, as he was unable to translate his combat victories into profit from either ransom or seized booty.  relates that the Earl of Essex, expecting the customary tribute from his valorous knight after the battle, jokingly remarked: "Oh? But Marshal, what are you saying? You had forty or sixty of them—yet you refuse me so small a thing!"

In 1167, he was sponsored by William de Tancarville in his first tournament, where he found his true calling and began to develop skills that later made him a tournament champion. 

In 1168 he served in the household of his mother's brother, Patrick, Earl of Salisbury. Later that year Patrick was escorting Queen Eleanor on a journey near the boundary of her province of Aquitaine and Marshal was part of the escort. They were ambushed by Guy de Lusignan who was trying to capture Queen Eleanor, Patrick was killed but Queen Eleanor escaped. In the ambush, William received a wound to his thigh and was taken to a Lusignan castle to be held for ransom. Someone at the castle took pity on the young knight because it is told that he received a loaf of bread in which were concealed several lengths of clean linen bandages with which to dress his wounds. This act of kindness by an unknown person perhaps saved Marshal's life as infection of the wound could have killed him. After a period of time, he was ransomed by Eleanor of Aquitaine, who was apparently impressed by tales of his bravery. He would remain a member of Queen Eleanor's household for the next two years, taking part in tournaments and increasing his reputation as a chivalrous knight.

Service to Young King Henry
In 1170, Marshal was appointed as Young King Henry's tutor-in-arms by the Young King's father, Henry II. During the Young King-led Revolt of 1173–1174, little is known of Marshal's specific activities besides his loyalty to the Young King. After the failed rebellion, Young King Henry and his retinue, including Marshal, travelled with Henry II for eighteen months, before asking for, and receiving, permission to travel to Europe to participate in knightly tournaments. Marshal followed the Young King, and from 1176-1182 both Marshal and the Young King gained prestige from winning tournaments. Tournaments were dangerous, often deadly, staged battles in which money and valuable prizes were to be won by capturing and ransoming opponents, their horses and armour. Marshal became a legendary tournament champion: on his deathbed, he recalled besting 500 knights during his tournament career.

In late 1182, Marshal was accused of having an affair with the Young King's wife, Margaret of France. Historian Thomas Asbridge has stated that, while the affair very strongly appears to have been fabricated by Marshal's political enemies within the Young King's service, it cannot be proven either way. David Crouch has suggested that the charge against William was actually one of lèse-majesté, brought on by Marshal's own arrogance and greed, with the charge of adultery only introduced in the Life of William Marshal as a distraction from the real charges, of which he was most probably guilty. Regardless of the truth of the accusations, by early 1183 Marshal had been removed from the Young King's service.

Young King Henry declared war against his brother, Richard the Lionheart, in January 1183, with Henry II siding with Richard. By May, Marshal had been cleared of all charges against the Young King, and returned to his service. However, the Young King became sick in late May, and died on 11 June 1183. On his deathbed, the Young King asked Marshal to fulfil the vow the Young King had made in 1182 to take up the cross and undertake a crusade to the Holy Land, and after receiving Henry II's blessing Marshal left for Jerusalem in late 1183. Nothing is known of his activities during the two years he was gone, except that he fulfilled the Young King's vow, and secretly committed to joining the Knights Templar on his deathbed.

Royal favour

After his return from the Holy Land in late 1185 or early 1186, William rejoined the court of King Henry II, and now served as a loyal captain through the many difficulties of Henry II's final years. The returns of royal favour were almost immediate. The king gave William the large royal estate of Cartmel in Cumbria, and the keeping of Heloise, the heiress of the northern barony of Lancaster. It may be that the king expected him to take the opportunity to marry her and become a northern baron, but William seems to have had grander ambitions for his marriage. 

In 1188, faced with an attempt by Philip II to seize the disputed region of Berry, Henry II summoned the Marshal to his side. The letter by which he did this survives, and makes some sarcastic comments about William's complaints that he had not been properly rewarded to date for his service to the king. Henry therefore promised him the marriage and lands of Dionisia, lady of Châteauroux in Berry. In the resulting campaign, the king fell out with his heir Richard, count of Poitou, who consequently allied with Philip II against his father. 

In 1189, while covering the flight of Henry II from Le Mans to Chinon, William unhorsed the undutiful Richard in a skirmish. William could have killed the prince but killed his horse instead, to make that point clear. He is said to have been the only man ever to unhorse Richard. Nonetheless, after Henry's death Marshal was welcomed at court by his former adversary, now King Richard I, apparently recognizing that Marshal's loyalty and military accomplishments were too useful to ignore, especially for a king who was intending to go on Crusade.

During the old king's last days he had promised the Marshal the hand and estates of Isabel de Clare (c.1172–1220), but had not completed the arrangements. King Richard, however, confirmed the offer and so in August 1189, at the age of 43, the Marshal married the 17-year-old daughter of Richard de Clare (Strongbow). Her father had been Earl of Pembroke, and Marshal acquired large estates and claims in England, Wales, Normandy and Ireland. Some estates, however, were excluded from the deal. Marshal did not obtain Pembroke and the title of earl, which his father-in-law had enjoyed, until 1199, as it had been taken into the king's hand in 1154. However, the marriage transformed the landless knight from a minor family into one of the richest men in the kingdom, a sign of his power and prestige at court. They had five sons and five daughters, and have numerous descendants. William made many improvements to his wife's lands, including extensive additions to Pembroke Castle and Chepstow Castle. Even though the marriage was a reward for his political and military services, and despite the twenty-six year age difference, the couple appear to have developed a real love and affection for each other. It is also notable that there is no evidence that Marshall ever took a mistress, which was commonplace for nobles and often widely discussed and reported.

William was included in the council of regency which King Richard appointed on his departure for the Third Crusade in 1190. He took the side of John, the king's brother, when the latter expelled the justiciar, William Longchamp, from the kingdom, but he soon discovered that the interests of John were different from those of Richard. Hence in 1193 he joined with the loyalists in making war upon him. In Spring 1194, during the course of the hostilities in England and before King Richard's return, William Marshal's elder brother John Marshal (who was serving as seneschal) was killed while defending Marlborough for the king's brother John. Richard allowed Marshal to succeed his brother in the hereditary marshalship, and his paternal honour of Hamstead Marshall. The Marshal served the king in his wars in Normandy against Philip II. On Richard's death-bed, the king designated Marshal as custodian of Rouen and of the royal treasure during the interregnum.

King John and Magna Carta

William supported King John when he became king in 1199, arguing against those who maintained the claims of Arthur of Brittany, the teenage son of John's elder brother Geoffrey. William was heavily engaged with the defence of Normandy against the growing pressure of the Capetian armies between 1200 and 1203. He sailed with King John when he abandoned the duchy in December 1203. He and the king had a falling out in the aftermath of the loss of the duchy, when he was sent with the earl of Leicester as ambassadors to negotiate a truce with King Philip II of France in 1204. The Marshal took the opportunity to negotiate the continued possession of his Norman lands.

Before commencing negotiations with King Philip, William had been generously permitted to do homage to the King of France by King John so he might keep his possessions in Normandy; land which must have been of sentimental value due to the time spent there in his adolescence. However, once official negotiations began, Philip demanded that such homage be paid exclusively to him, which King John had not consented to. When William paid homage to King Philip, John took offence and there was a major row at court which led to cool relations between the two men. This became outright hostility in 1207 when John began to move against several major Irish magnates, including William.
Though he left for Leinster in 1207 William was recalled and humiliated at court in the autumn of 1208, while John's justiciar in Ireland Meilyr fitz Henry invaded his lands, burning the town of New Ross.

Meilyr's defeat by Countess Isabel led to her husband's return to Leinster. He was once again in conflict with King John in his war with the Braose and Lacy families in 1210, but managed to survive. He stayed in Ireland until 1213, during which time he had Carlow Castle erected and restructured his honour of Leinster. Taken back into favour in 1212, he was summoned in 1213 to return to the English court.
Despite their differences, William remained loyal throughout the hostilities between John and his barons which culminated on 15 June 1215 at Runnymede with the sealing of Magna Carta. William was one of the few English earls to remain loyal to the king through the First Barons' War. It was William whom King John trusted on his deathbed to make sure John's nine-year-old son Henry would get the throne. It was William who took responsibility for the king's funeral and burial at Worcester Cathedral.

Regent for Henry III 
On 11 November 1216 at Gloucester, upon the death of King John, William Marshal was named by the king's council (the chief barons who had remained loyal to King John in the First Barons' War) to serve as protector of the nine-year-old King Henry III, and regent of the kingdom. In spite of his advanced age (around 70) he prosecuted the war against Prince Louis and the rebel barons with remarkable energy. In the battle of Lincoln he charged and fought at the head of the young King's army, leading them to victory. He was preparing to besiege Louis in London when the war was terminated by the naval victory of Hubert de Burgh in the straits of Dover.

William was criticized for the generosity of the terms he accorded to Louis and the rebels in September 1217, but his desire for an expedient settlement was dictated by sound statesmanship. Self-restraint and compromise were the keynotes of Marshal's policy, hoping to secure peace and stability for his young liege. Both before and after the peace of 1217 he reissued the Magna Carta, in which he is a signatory as one of the witnessing barons.

Death and legacy

By 1219 the Marshal had reached an advanced age for the time and his health was in decline. By March, he realised that he was dying, so he summoned his eldest son, also William, and his household knights, and left the Tower of London for his estate at Caversham in Berkshire, near Reading, where he called a meeting of the barons, Henry III, the Papal legate Pandulf Verraccio, the royal justiciar (Hubert de Burgh), and Peter des Roches (Bishop of Winchester and the young King's guardian). William rejected the Bishop's claim to the regency and entrusted the regency to the care of the papal legate; he apparently did not trust the Bishop or any of the other magnates that he had gathered to this meeting. Fulfilling the vow he had made while on crusade, he was invested into the order of the Knights Templar on his deathbed. He died peacefully on 14 May 1219 at Caversham, surrounded by his friends and family. He was buried in the Temple Church in London, where his tomb can still be seen.

A statue of Marshal on horseback was unveiled in front of Pembroke Castle in May 2022. It was created by Harriet Addyman, and followed a campaign by Pembroke and Monkton Local History Society.

Descendants of William Marshal and Isabel de Clare
William Marshal, 2nd Earl of Pembroke (11906 April 1231), married (1) Alice de Béthune, daughter of Baldwin of Bethune; (2) 23 April 1224 Eleanor Plantagenet, daughter of King John of England. They had no children.
Richard Marshal, 3rd Earl of Pembroke (119116 April 1234), married Gervaise de Dinan. He died in captivity. They had no children.
Maud Marshal (119427 March 1248), married (1) Hugh Bigod, 3rd Earl of Norfolk, they had four children; (2) William de Warenne, 5th Earl of Surrey, they had two children.
Gilbert Marshal, 4th Earl of Pembroke (119727 June 1241), married (1) Marjorie of Scotland, youngest daughter of King William I of Scotland; by an unknown mistress he had one illegitimate daughter:
Isabel Marshal, betrothed to Rhys ap Maelgwn Fychan (son of Maelgwn ap Rhys)
Walter Marshal, 5th Earl of Pembroke (c. 1199November 1245), married Margaret de Quincy, Countess of Lincoln, granddaughter of Hugh de Kevelioc, 3rd Earl of Chester. No children.
Isabel Marshal (9 October 120017 January 1240), married (1) Gilbert de Clare, 4th Earl of Hertford, whose daughter Isabel de Clare married Robert Bruce, 5th Lord of Annandale, the grandfather of Robert the Bruce; (2) Richard Plantagenet, Earl of Cornwall
Sibyl Marshal (c. 120127 April 1245), married William de Ferrers, 5th Earl of Derby; they had seven daughters.
 Agnes de Ferrers (died 11 May 1290), married William de Vesci.
 Isabel de Ferrers (died before 26 November 1260)
 Maud de Ferrers (died 12 March 1298), married (1) Simon de Kyme, (2) William de Vivonia (de Forz), and (3) Amaury IX of Rochechouart.
 Sibyl de Ferrers, married Sir Franco de Bohun.
 Joan de Ferrers (died 1267)
 Agatha de Ferrers (died May 1306), married Hugh de Mortimer, of Chelmarsh.
 Eleanor de Ferrers (died 16 October 1274), married to:
Eva Marshal (1203–1246), married William de Braose, Lord of Abergavenny
 Isabella de Braose (born 1222), married Prince Dafydd ap Llywelyn. She died childless.
 Maud de Braose (1224–1301), in 1247, she married Roger Mortimer, 1st Baron Mortimer and they had descendants.
 Eva de Braose (122728 July 1255), married Sir William de Cantelou and had descendants.
 Eleanor de Braose (c. 12281251). On an unknown date after August 1241, she married Sir Humphrey de Bohun and had descendants.
Anselm Marshal, 6th Earl of Pembroke (c. 120822 December 1245), married Maud de Bohun, daughter of Humphrey de Bohun, 2nd Earl of Hereford. They had no children.
Joan Marshal (1210–1234), married Warin de Munchensi (died 1255), Lord of Swanscombe
Joan de Munchensi (123020 September 1307) married William of Valence, the fourth son of King John's widow, Isabella of Angoulême, and her second husband, Hugh X of Lusignan, Count of La Marche. Valence was half-brother to Henry III and Edward I's uncle.

Fate of the Marshal family
During Ireland's civil wars, William took two manors that the Bishop of Ferns claimed but could not get back. Some years after William's death, that bishop is said to have laid a curse on the family that William's sons would have no children, and the great Marshal estates would be scattered. Each of William's sons did become earl of Pembroke and marshal of England, and each died without legitimate issue. William's vast holdings were then divided among the husbands of his five daughters. The title of "Marshal" went to the husband of the oldest daughter, Hugh Bigod, 3rd Earl of Norfolk, and later passed to the Mowbray dukes of Norfolk and then to the Howard dukes of Norfolk, becoming "Earl Marshal" along the way. The title of "Earl of Pembroke" passed to William of Valence, the husband of Joan Marshal's daughter, Joan de Munchensi; he became the first of the de Valence line of earls of Pembroke.

Through his daughter Isabel, William is an ancestor to both the Bruce and Stewart kings of Scots. Through his granddaughter Maud de Braose, William is an ancestor to the last Plantagenet kings, Edward IV through to Richard III, and all English monarchs from Henry VIII and afterwards.

See also
Cultural depictions of William Marshal, 1st Earl of Pembroke

Notes

References

Attribution

Sources

Benson, Larry D. (1980). 'The Tournament in the romances of Chrétien de Troyes and L'Histoire de Guillaume le Maréchal' in Studies in Medieval Culture XIV 1–24
Crouch, David (2007). "Biography as Propaganda in the 'History of William Marshal", in Convaincre et persuader: Communication et propagande aux XII et XIIIe siècles. Ed. par Martin Aurell. Poitiers: Université de Poitiers-centre d'études supérieures de civilisation médiévale.
Crouch, David edited (2015). The Acts and Letters of the Marshal Family, Marshals of England and Earls of Pembroke, 1145-1248. Camden Society, 5th series, vol. 47. 
 
Duby, Georges (1985). William Marshal, the Flower of Chivalry. New York: Pantheon.
Gillingham, John (1988). "War and Chivalry in the History of William the Marshal" in Thirteenth Century England II ed. P.R. Coss and S.D. Lloyd. Woodbridge, 1–13.
Meyer, Paul (1891–1901). L'Histoire de Guillaume le Maréchal, with partial translation of the original sources into Modern French. Edition, History of William Marshal, (3 vols). Paris: Société de l'histoire de France. Volume 1 Volume 2 Volume 3

External links

William Marshall at Castlewales.com
Abels, Richard, William Marshal—Events in Life and Historical Context

1140s births
1219 deaths
12th-century English nobility
13th-century English nobility
13th-century viceregal rulers
Earls Marshal
Anglo-Normans
Anglo-Normans in Wales
Normans in Ireland
Norman warriors
William
English soldiers
High Sheriffs of Sussex
Male Shakespearean characters
Marshals of England
People from Caversham, Reading
People from Chepstow
People from Hamstead Marshall
People from Marlborough, Wiltshire
People from Newbury, Berkshire
People associated with Sandleford, Berkshire
Regents of England
Burials at the Temple Church
People of the Barons' Wars